Camp Kabeyun is a summer camp for boys founded in 1924 by educator John Porter.  It sits on 85 acres on the south end of Lake Winnipesaukee in Alton, New Hampshire. Kabeyun's program is designed to encourage boys' individual growth, self-awareness, and confidence in the context of community living. Boys at Kabeyun choose their own activities each morning and again at lunch. Activities include land and water sports, projects such as photography and leather working, and adventure trips, often in the White Mountains. Kabeyun has a high staff return rate and many counselors who are former campers.  Former camper and counselor Josh Wolk wrote a memoir, Cabin Pressure, based on Kabeyun.

Notable alumni 

 David Hyde Pierce, actor

References 
Source: www.kabeyun.org.

External links 
 Kabeyun website

Kabeyun
Kabeyun
Buildings and structures in Belknap County, New Hampshire
Alton, New Hampshire